Juliette Mayniel (born 22 January 1936) is a French actress. She appeared in more than 30 films and television shows between 1958 and 1978. At the 10th Berlin International Film Festival, she won the Silver Bear for Best Actress for her role in the film The Fair. From 1964 to 1968 she was the partner of the Italian actor Vittorio Gassman with whom she had a son, Alessandro, an actor too. She now lives in Mexico.

Early life 
The daughter of French peasants, Mayniel grew up in an isolated village. Her parents' country house became the Allied headquarters during World War II.

Her feature film debut was Les Cousins. The film's director and producer, Claude Chabrol, writes in his autobiography that he discovered her in an advertisement film for soap.

Selected filmography
 Les Cousins (1959)
 The Fair (1960)
 Eyes Without a Face (1960)
 The Trojan Horse (1961)
 Landru (1963)
 Ophelia (1963)
 Because, Because of a Woman (1963)
 Amori pericolosi (1964)
 Assassination in Rome (1965)
 L'Odissea (1968)
 Listen, Let's Make Love (1969)
 Flatfoot (1973)
 The Bloodstained Shadow (1978)

References

External links
 

1936 births
Living people
French film actresses
20th-century French actresses
French television actresses
Silver Bear for Best Actress winners
People from Aveyron